Friedrich Marquardt Slevogt (22 March 1909 in Karlsruhe – 25 May 1980) was a German ice hockey player who competed in the 1928 Winter Olympics and 1932 Winter Olympics.

In 1928 he was a member of the German ice hockey team, which placed last in his preliminary group of the Olympic tournament and did not advance.

Four years later he was a member of the German ice hockey team, which won the bronze medal. He played five matches.

External links
profile

1909 births
1980 deaths
Ice hockey players at the 1928 Winter Olympics
Ice hockey players at the 1932 Winter Olympics
Olympic bronze medalists for Germany
Olympic ice hockey players of Germany
SC Riessersee players
Olympic medalists in ice hockey
Medalists at the 1932 Winter Olympics
Sportspeople from Karlsruhe